Wedding in Barenhof is a 1942 German historical comedy film directed by Carl Froelich and starring Heinrich George, Paul Wegener and Ilse Werner.

The film's art direction was by Walter Haag. It was shot at the Babelsberg Studios in Berlin.

Cast

References

External links

Films of Nazi Germany
Films based on works by Hermann Sudermann
Films directed by Carl Froelich
Films set in the 1890s
Films set in Prussia
German horse racing films
UFA GmbH films
German black-and-white films
German historical comedy films
1940s historical comedy films
Films shot at Babelsberg Studios
1942 comedy films
1940s German films